Ant is an English nickname abbreviated from the given name Anthony/Antony in use throughout North America, Guyana and English speaking countries in Europe, Africa, Asia and  Oceania. It is also a stage name, given name and a surname.

Stage name
 Ant (comedian) stage name of Anthony Steven Kalloniatis (born 1967), American stand-up comedian and actor
 Ant (producer) stage name of Anthony Davis (born 1970), American record producer and member of Rhymesayers
 ANT solo performance name of Antony Harding (fl. c. 2000), British musician
 Anthony McPartlin (born 1975), an English television presenter, one half of the duo Ant & Dec
Ant-Bee stage name of Billy James (born 1960), American musician and writer
ASAP Ant, A$AP Mob rap collective member
Ant Trip Ceremony 1960s band name
Ant Lady, ring name of Syuri.

Nickname

Ant Anstead, nickname of Anthony Richard Anstead (born 1979), English television presenter, motor specialist, car builder, designer and artist
Ant Banks, nickname of Anthony Banks (born 1969), American producer and rapper
Ant Botha, nickname of Anthony Greyvensteyn Botha (born 1976), South African cricketer
Ant Clemons, nickname of Anthony Clemons Jr. (born 1991), American singer-songwriter
 Ant Henson, nickname of Anthony Mark Henson (born 1989), British singer-songwriter
Ant Middleton, nickname of Anthony Middleton (born 1980), English television presenter
Ant Neely (born 1923), nickname of Antony Neely, English composer and musician
Ant Pedersen, nickname of Anthony Pedersen (born 1988), New Zealander racing driver
Ant Strachan, nickname of Anthony Duncan Strachan (born 1966), New Zealander rugby union player
Ant Whiting, nickname of Anthony Whiting, British songwriter, instrumentalist, and producer
Ant Whorton-Eales, nickname of Anthony Whorton-Eales (born 1994), British racing driver 
 Anthony Phillips (born 1951), British guitarist for the band Genesis, nicknamed "Ant"
 Anthony Spilotro (1938–1986), American mobster nicknamed "The Ant"
Anthony West (motorcyclist) (born 1981), Australian motorcycle road racer, nicknamed "Ant"

Given name

Ant Gyi (1923 – 2017) Burmese singer and musician
Ant Sang (born 1970) New Zealander comic book artist and designer
Ant Simpson, Australian entertainer
Ant Timpson (born 1966) New Zealander producer
Ant Wan (fl 2018–present), Swedish rapper

Surname
Adam Ant (born Stuart Leslie Goddard; 1954), English singer and musician
Clara Ant (born 1948), Bolivian architect and political activist
George Ant, Greek music video director

Fictional characters
 Ant (comics), Image comics character
 The Ant (comics), DC Comics superhero
 Ant, WordWorld show character
Ant, Ant and Bee series character
Atom Ant, Hanna-Barbera cartoon superhero
Ant-Man, various Marvel Comics superheroes
Pants Ant, book and cartoon fictional character
Charlie Ant, United Artist The Ant and the Aardvark series character
Anthony Ant, protagonist of Anthony Ant animated United States/Canada/United Kingdom TV series that takes place in "Antville"
Ant Jones, character from Grange Hill
Ant Richards, character from Shortland Street

See also

Tracy Williams (fl. 2009–present), American professional wrestler with stage names Green Ant and Silver Ant
Drew Gulak (born 1987), American professional wrestler who has used the stage name Soldier Ant
Abt (surname)
Alt (surname)
An (surname)
Ana (given name)
Anat (disambiguation)
ANC (disambiguation)
And (disambiguation)
Anet (disambiguation)
Ang (surname)
Ani (given name)
Ani (surname)
Ans (given name)
Ante (name), also derived from Antonius
Anth (name), also derived from Antonius
Anto (name), also derived from Antonius
Ants (given name)
Anu (name)
Art (given name)
ATN (disambiguation)

Notes